WIBA may refer to:

 Women's International Boxing Association
 Women's International Baseball Association
 WIBA (AM), a radio station (1310 AM) licensed to Madison, Wisconsin, United States
 WIBA-FM, a radio station (101.5 FM) licensed to Madison, Wisconsin, United States